Johannes Even (December 10, 1903 – November 24, 1964) was a German politician of the Christian Democratic Union (CDU) and former member of the German Bundestag.

Life 
After the Second World War Even participated in the foundation of the CDU in the district of Bergheim (Erft). Since 1960 he was a member of the state and federal executive committees. From 1946 to 1950 he was a member of the state parliament of North Rhine-Westphalia.

From 1949 until his death in 1964 he was a member of the Bundestag. He was always directly elected to parliament in the constituency of Bergheim-Euskirchen. From 1953 he was a member of the executive committee of the CDU/CSU parliamentary group.

Literature

References

1903 births
1964 deaths
Members of the Bundestag for North Rhine-Westphalia
Members of the Bundestag 1961–1965
Members of the Bundestag 1957–1961
Members of the Bundestag 1953–1957
Members of the Bundestag 1949–1953
Members of the Bundestag for the Christian Democratic Union of Germany
Members of the Landtag of North Rhine-Westphalia